The Jonava Market is a local market in the city of Jonava, Lithuania.

History 
The Jonava Market was established in the 18–19th century. It became famous as a marketplace for grains and horses. In 2010, the Jonava Market was renovated: a roof was added over the food section, more pavilions were built, and indoor stalls were renovated.

Retail markets in Lithuania
Economy of Jonava
Buildings and structures in Jonava